Search for the New Land is an album by jazz trumpeter Lee Morgan. A set with a group of regular Blue Note sidemen, Search for the New Land was recorded before The Sidewinder was released. Although it was recorded in 1964, the album was shelved for two years, then issued with the original catalogue number 84169.

Reception
It has been described by jazz commentator Scott Yanow as "one of the finest Lee Morgan records." The album reached #16 on Billboards "Black Albums" chart and #143 on "Pop Albums".

Track listing
All compositions by Lee Morgan
"Search for the New Land" – 15:45
"The Joker" – 5:04
"Mr. Kenyatta" – 8:43
"Melancholee" – 6:14
"Morgan the Pirate" – 6:30

Personnel

Performance
Lee Morgan – trumpet
Wayne Shorter – tenor sax
Herbie Hancock – piano
Grant Green – guitar
Reggie Workman – bass
Billy Higgins – drums

Production
Bob Blumenthal – liner notes
Micaela Boland – art direction, graphic design
Michael Cuscuna – reissue producer
Nat Hentoff – liner notes
Gordon Jee – creative director
Alfred Lion – producer
Reid Miles – cover design
Rudy Van Gelder – engineer, remastering
Francis Wolff – photography, cover photo

References

1964 albums
Albums produced by Alfred Lion
Albums recorded at Van Gelder Studio
Blue Note Records albums
Lee Morgan albums